Northern Nigeria (Hausa: Arewacin Najeriya) was a British protectorate which lasted from 1900 until 1914 and covered the northern part of what is now Nigeria.

The protectorate spanned  and included the emirates of the Sokoto Caliphate and parts of the former Bornu Empire, conquered in 1902.  The first High Commissioner of the protectorate was Frederick Lugard, who suppressed slavery and tribal raiding and created a system of administration built around native authorities.

The Protectorate was ended on 1 January 1914, when its area was unified with the Southern Nigeria Protectorate and the Lagos Colony, becoming the Northern Province of the Colony and Protectorate of Nigeria.

Foundation

The Berlin Conference of 1884 and 1885 provided the area that would become the Northern Nigeria Protectorate to the British. The Royal Niger Company was formed in 1886 with George Taubman Goldie as the vice governor. The Company moved in-land and negotiated trade agreements and political agreements, sometimes coercive, with several local chieftains. In 1897, Frederick Lugard was the appointed head of the West African Frontier Force which was tasked with stopping Fulani resistance and possible French incursions in the northwest area.

On 1 January 1900, the Royal Niger Company's charter was revoked and the British government took control, in a ceremony where Lugard read the proclamation. The Royal Niger Company was paid £865,000 and was given the rights to half of all mining revenue in a large part of the areas for 99 years in exchange for ceding the territory to the British government. Lugard was appointed the High Commissioner of the newly created Northern Nigeria Protectorate. Lokoja was the capital from 1900, but Zungeru became the headquarters for the protectorate in 1902 because it was the most northerly city accessible by river transport.

Military campaign
Military operations began in 1902 and continued for about five years of sporadic fighting. The remnants of the Bornu Empire were conquered in 1902 and the Sokoto Caliphate and was defeated in the Battle of Kano. Fighting continued in 1904 in Bassa.In 1906, a Mahdist rebellion broke out outside the city of Sokoto in the village of Satiru. Elements of the Royal West African Frontier Force were dispatched to suppress the rebellion; upon hearing news of what had transpired, Muhammadu Attahiru II dispatched a mixed force of 300 Sokoto cavalry and infantry led by Mallam Isa to join them. The combined force successfully suppressed the rebellion, which marked the last major instance of armed resistance to British rule in the region. After 1907 there were fewer revolts and use of military force by the British and the focus of the High Commissioner turned toward taxation and administration.

Administration
The British Administration began with Frederick Lugard as the first High Commissioner. In 1907, Lugard left Nigeria for Hong Kong and Percy Girouard became the new High Commissioner. Girouard had a long history of rail construction in Canada and Africa and was tasked with substantial railroad construction in the Protectorate. In 1909, Henry Hesketh Bell, the governor of the Uganda Protectorate was appointed high commissioner. Charles Lindsay Temple became the acting Head Commissioner in 1911 and 1912 and began overseeing, with close collaboration with Lugard, the creation of the Colony and Protectorate of Nigeria

One defining characteristic of administration in Northern Nigeria Protectorate was the inclusion of chiefs and emirs as "native authorities" fitting into British administration. Taxation proved very difficult in the protectorate for the first years of British rule.  Lugard's attempts to institute poll taxes were foiled by the Emirates, the need to introduce coin controversy and attempts to tax trade were opposed by powerful merchants. This created a substantial deficit in the budget of the Protectorate and public works projects had to be paid by grants from the British Empire.  As a result, the British often had significant shortages of British personnel before 1907.  These pragmatic concerns resulted in incorporation of the traditional authorities within the British structure.

These same financial and administrative challenges resulted in discussions led by Lugard for the unification of the Lagos Colony, the Southern Nigeria Protectorate, and Northern Nigeria.  The disparities between the protectorates was to be corrected by creating a central administration in Lagos, with custom revenues from the south paying for the projects in the north. The unified Colony and Protectorate of Nigeria began in 1914 and had two lieutenant governors with one responsible for the area of the southern province and another responsible for the northern province. The administration in the north remained largely separate and included and deepened the use of native authorities.  These divisions have been found to persist in many respects to this day.

See also
 British West Africa
 Northern Nigeria Gazette
 Scramble for Africa
 Sir Richmond Palmer

References

External links
 The British Empire – Northern Nigeria

Colonial Nigeria
History of Northern Nigeria
British West Africa
Former British colonies and protectorates in Africa
History of Lagos
History of Nigeria
Former Nigerian administrative divisions
1900s in Nigeria
1910s in Nigeria
States and territories established in 1900
States and territories disestablished in 1914
1914 disestablishments in Nigeria
1900 establishments in the British Empire
1914 disestablishments in the British Empire
British colonisation in Africa
Nigeria, Northern